The Geamărtălui (also: Gemărtălui) is a right tributary of the river Olteț in Romania. It discharges into the Olteț in the town Balș. The following towns and villages are situated along the river, from source to mouth: Velești, Balota de Sus, Balota de Jos, Bușteni, Gaia, Murgași, Picăturile, Plopșorelu, Tabaci, Vulpeni, Gropșani, Găvănești, Dâmburile, Baldovinești and Balș.

Tributaries

The following rivers are tributaries to the river Geamărtălui (from source to mouth):

Left: Bejanul, Pârâul Mijlociu, Horezu
Right: Valea Satului, Valea Gorgota, Ungureni, Bălășița

References

Rivers of Dolj County
Rivers of Olt County
Rivers of Romania